Atemlos Live (Breathless - Live) is the fourth live album by German electronic musician, composer and producer Christopher von Deylen under his Schiller alias. The double album features several live recordings of the Atemlos (Breathless) album tracks. Recorded during Schiller's 'Atemlos Live' tour, spring 2010.

Track listing

References

External links 
 

2010 albums
Live albums by German artists
Universal Music Germany albums
Island Records live albums
Schiller (band) albums